Vagner José Dias Gonçalves (born 10 January 1996), or simply Vagner, is a Cape Verdean professional footballer who plays as a forward for Belgian club Seraing on loan from the French club FC Metz, and the Cape Verde national team.

Club career
On 13 January 2015, Vagner made his professional debut with Gil Vicente in a 2014–15 Taça da Liga match against Estoril Praia.

In July 2020, Vagner joined Ligue 1 side Metz from Saint-Étienne after playing for Nancy in Ligue 2 from January 2019. He signed a four-year contract while Saint-Étienne reportedly received a transfer fee of €3 million plus bonuses.

On 29 August 2021, he joined FC Sion in Switzerland on a season-long loan with an option to buy.

On 6 September 2022, Vagner moved on a new loan to Seraing in the Belgian Pro League.

International career
Vagner made his professional for the Cape Verde national team in a friendly 3–2 win over Algeria on 1 June 2019.

He was named in the roster for the 2021 Africa cup of nations  when the team reached the round of 16

International goals
Scores and results list Cape Verde's goal tally first, score column indicates score after each Vagner goal.

References

External links
 
 
 Stats and profile at LPFP 

1996 births
People from Mindelo
Living people
Association football forwards
Cape Verdean footballers
Cape Verde international footballers
Gil Vicente F.C. players
AS Saint-Étienne players
AS Nancy Lorraine players
FC Metz players
FC Sion players
R.F.C. Seraing (1922) players
Liga Portugal 2 players
Ligue 1 players
Ligue 2 players
Championnat National 2 players
Swiss Super League players
Belgian Pro League players
2021 Africa Cup of Nations players
Cape Verdean expatriate footballers
Expatriate footballers in Portugal
Cape Verdean expatriate sportspeople in Portugal
Expatriate footballers in France
Cape Verdean expatriate sportspeople in France
Expatriate footballers in Switzerland
Cape Verdean expatriate sportspeople in Switzerland
Expatriate footballers in Belgium
Cape Verdean expatriate sportspeople in Belgium